The Rialto Theater is a historic movie theater at Race and Spring Streets in central Searcy, Arkansas.  Built in the 1920s and renovated in 1940, it is one of the few buildings in all of White County to exhibit Art Deco styling (a result of the 1940 alterations), and the only theater with that styling.  Its neon marquee is also the most elaborate known in the county.

The theater was listed on the National Register of Historic Places in 1991.

See also
National Register of Historic Places listings in White County, Arkansas

References

External links

Theatres on the National Register of Historic Places in Arkansas
Art Deco architecture in Arkansas
National Register of Historic Places in Searcy, Arkansas
Theatres completed in the 20th century
1920s establishments in Arkansas
Cultural infrastructure completed in the 1920s